Catania S.S.D., commonly known as Catania, is an Italian football club based in the city of Catania, Sicily, that plays in .

Originally founded in 1908 as Associazione Sportiva pro Educazione Fisica, the club boasts 17 appearances in the top flight, achieved moderate success, reaching the top position of eighth place in Serie A on four occasions: during the early 1960s and again in 2012–13. However, this has not stopped it remaining one of the most important clubs in Southern Italy; is the 12th most popular team in Italy, with around 600,000 fans. The club also went on a number of dissolutions and refoundations, the last happening in 2022.

History

Origin
The origins of football being played by representatives of the Province of Catania can be traced back to English cargo ships, thanks to the workers who brought the game to Sicily. Specifically, the earliest Catania team can be traced to a match which took place on 2 May 1901 at San Raineri di Messina against Messina; the team was named Royal Yacht Catania, an English ship with a local Catanian crew.

The ship workers' team was just a pastime, however, and Catania's first professional and most stable football club was founded on 19 June 1908 by Italian film director Gaetano Ventimiglia and Francesco Sturzo d'Aldobrando, who founded the club under the name A.S. Educazione Fisica Pro Patria. Early on, they would always play against sailors visiting the port of Catania, particularly from foreign ships. Though their first ever match was against the Italian battleship , the game ended in a 1–1 draw and the Catania line-up that day consisted of Vassallo, Gismondo, Bianchi, Messina, Slaiter, Caccamo, Stellario, Binning, Cocuzza, Ventimiglia and Pappalardo. Just two years later, they changed the name to Unione Sportiva Catanese.

Foundation
In the north of Italy, football was more organised and those clubs competed in the early Italian Football Championships, while the southern clubs competed in competitions such as the Lipton, Sant' Agata and Agordad cups. US Catanese survived World War I and just after played in the local Coppa Federale Siciliana. Seven seasons later, in 1927, they were entered into the Campionato Catanese, which was won in the 1928–29 season. As they gained promotion, the team entered the Second Division, but the fascist reform of Italian football dictated the disbandment of Catanese and the establishment of Società Sportiva Catania on 27 June 1929. The new club first competed in Serie B in the 1934–35 season, where they finished fourth; that year, Genoa won the Serie B title.

Catania played in the league for three seasons during this period before ultimately being relegated. Down in Serie C, Catania were crowned champions in the 1938–39 season, finishing above Sicilian rivals Siracusa and Messina, who came in second- and third-place respectively. Their return to Serie B was not a pleasant one; the club finished bottom of the league and won only three games that season. The club's name was briefly changed to Associazione Calcio Fascista Catania during the 1942–43 season in Serie C, which ended prematurely due to World War II.

Rebirth

After World War II ended, a local competition was organised, the Campionato Siciliano. US Catanese were back; at the end of that season, a local team named Elefante Catania were merged into the club. The merged club kept the Catanese name and competed in Serie C during the 1945–46 season, but finished last. In the same league that season, a team called Virtus Catania were also present, finishing eighth.

At the end of the season, Catanese and Virtus merged to form Club Calcio Catania, with the club's first president as Santi Manganaro-Passanisi, who had previously been president of Catanese. They were entered into Serie C, where they spent three seasons. After an epic duel with Reggina for first place in the league, Catania prevailed with stars such as Goffi, Messora, Ardesi and Prevosti, thereby gaining promotion to Serie B for the 1948–49 season.

Golden years
The late 1950s through 1960s are considered the golden years for the Catanian club, as they managed to achieve promotion to Serie A on two occasions during this time. Their first promotion from Serie B came when, during the 1953–54 season, they beat Cagliari and Lombardy side Pro Patria to be crowned champions of the division. Their first season in Serie A saw the club achieve a respectable 12th-place finish, but the club were forcibly relegated due to financial scandal (as were Udinese).

Under the management of Carmelo Di Bella, who had played for the club in the late 1930s, Catania gained promotion from Serie B in the 1959–60 season. The race for promotion in third spot went down to the last day of the season and was very tense. Catania had lost their final game 4–2 to Brescia and needed Parma to get a good result against Triestina for the Sicilian club to secure promotion. That is exactly what happened, and Catania had thus gained promotion once more.

Catania returned into Serie A for the 1960–61 season to begin what would be a six-year stay in the league. Their return season was emphatic, as the newly promoted club finished in eighth above top Italian clubs such as Lazio and Napoli. This season produced several notable wins; they beat Napoli and Bologna twice, Sampdoria 3–0 at home and most notably beat Milan 4–3 in Sicily. Additionally, on the final day of the season, they beat Internazionale 2–0, with goals from Castellazzi and Calvanese. This rubbed the salt into the wounds of Inter, who lost the closely contested title that year to Juventus.

Four years later, in 1965, Catania would also finish eighth in the league, this time above Roma and Sicilian rivals Messina. Many of the club's most notable stars played around this time, such as midfielders Alvaro Biagini and the Brazilian Chinesinho, along with wingers Carlo Facchin and Giancarlo Danova in the side. Catania more than held their own amongst the giants of Italian football, with wins against Juventus (2–0), Fiorentina (2–0) and Lazio (1–0).

Mixed fortunes in the 1970s and 1980s
After Catania's relegation in 1966, Carmelo Di Bella left and the club stayed in Serie B, later notably clashing with Palermo in the Sicilian derby before the Palermitan club was promoted. Catania followed in 1969–70 with a third-place finish, ensuring promotion. Their stay in Serie A this time, however, was very brief, and they were relegated after just one season. Their most impressive results that season was 3–1 win against Lazio and a draw at home against Milan. Catania lacked goalscorers at the time, as they only scored 18 goals altogether in 30 games.

Worse was to come for the club, who in 1973–74 were relegated down to Serie C, but they were able to bounce straight back with a promotion into Serie B as champions. A similar situation occurred in 1976–77, where they were relegated down to Serie C. This time, however, they were not able to bounce right back; they finished second and then third before finally being crowned champions of what was now known as Serie C1 in 1979–80.

After three short seasons, Catania were promoted after finishing in third place, behind Milan and Lazio, into Serie A. They played the 1983–84 season in Italy's top league, but it proved to be an especially dismal season, with only one win (which came against Pisa) and 12 points despite the presence of Claudio Ranieri and Brazilian imports Luvanor and Pedrinho.

Decline and revival
The decline of Catania began most evidently after its last relegation to Serie B. The team was no longer able to reach the top division of Italian football, and instead continued to decline, remaining in Serie C1 for the latter part of the 1980s. The lowest point of the club's history, however, was reached in 1993, when the team's participation for the year was cancelled by the Italian Football Federation (FIGC) due to financial irregularities.

After a long judicial battle, however, magistrates declared the FIGC's decision as invalid, thus forcing it to include Catania back into the footballing fold for the year. Catania was thus included in the Sicilian Eccellenza (the sixth tier of Italian football), but in the meantime another Sicilian football team, Atletico Leonzio from Lentini (in the Province of Syracuse), had been relocated in the city and renamed Atletico Catania. Despite all of this, the "real" Catania was able to rise back to Serie C in a relatively small number of years, and even back to Serie B in 2002.

In 2003, Catania was at the centre of a controversy that led to the enlargement of Serie B from 20 to 24 teams, known as Caso Catania. The club claimed that Siena fielded an ineligible player in a 1–1 tie, a result which saw Catania relegated, whereas the two extra points from a victory would have kept them safe. They were awarded a 2–0 victory before the result was reverted because the guilty player was a substitute which did not play the match, then Catania appealed to the judges of the Autonomous Region of Sicily who re-awarded the victory again. In August, the FIGC decided to let Catania, along with Genoa and Salernitana, stay in Serie B; the newly reborn Fiorentina were also added for the 2003–04 season. The ruling led to protests and boycotts by the other Serie B clubs that delayed the start of the season, until the intervention of the Italian government.

The league was reduced to 22 teams for 2004–05, while at the same time Serie A expanded from 18 to 20 teams. During the start of that season, Antonino Pulvirenti, chairman of the flight company Windjet and owner of Acireale, a Sicilian Serie C1 team, bought the club. Catania's new ownership let the team enjoy a revival, and in 2005–06 Catania ended in second position, earning promotion to Serie A.

Return to Serie A
The 2006–07 season saw Catania in Serie A for its first appearance in 22 years. In their first year back, Catania began well, and though they recorded a couple of heavy defeats, their home form saw them peak as high as fourth after 20 games.

Their return season changed drastically on 2 February 2007, due to the 2007 Catania football violence incident. It happened during the Sicilian derby with Palermo, where policeman Filippo Raciti was killed during football-related violence caused by Catania ultras outside the Stadio Angelo Massimino. The event led FIGC Commissioner Luca Pancalli to cancel all football-related events in the country for a period of time, including league and national team matches. Catania chairman and owner Antonino Pulvirenti announced his willingness to leave the football world, stating it was not possible to go on producing football in Catania.

After the Italian football league restarted, Catania continued on but dropped in form largely. In truth, their slump in form had started just before the derby incident and all together they failed to win for 12 games in a row before beating Udinese 1–0 in late April 2007, where they eventually finished 13th.

The following season, with manager Pasquale Marino leaving for Udinese and Silvio Baldini taking charge of the team, proved to be much harder. Poor results in the league table were however coupled with impressive performance in the Coppa Italia, where Catania reached a historical place in the semi-finals, then lost to Roma. Meanwhile, Baldini resigned from his post on 31 March 2008, being replaced by Walter Zenga in a somewhat surprise appointment (at least due to Zenga's lack of expertise at the Serie A level). Despite this, Zenga managed to lead the rossazzurri off the relegation zone, saving his side from falling down to Serie B in a heated final week game, a 1–1 home tie to Roma, with an equaliser goal scored by Jorge Martínez in the 85th minute. Zenga was successively confirmed in charge of the team for the upcoming 2008–09 season.

On 5 June 2009, Zenga left Catania to be the manager at arch-rival Palermo. He was replaced by Gianluca Atzori, a relative coaching neophyte with just one year's experience at Lega Pro Prima Divisione team Ravenna. Atzori was noted for using an attacking 4–3–3 formation at Ravenna and was expected to continue a similar approach with the Elefanti.

On 8 December 2009, Siniša Mihajlović was appointed new head coach of Catania, taking over from Atzori. He signed a contract until June 2011 with the Elefanti. Arriving at the club that was dead last in the Serie A standings, Mihajlović debuted with a loss against Livorno. The following week, however, his team pulled off a stunning upset by beating heavily favoured Juventus away in Turin with a 2–1 scoreline. After Mihajlović's departure to Fiorentina, Catania appointed Marco Giampaolo as new head coach for the 2010–11 season. In January 2011, Catania decided to remove Giampaolo from his position due to poor results and replace him with former Argentine star Diego Simeone, who had no previous experience at Serie A level but managed to guide the Sicilians to safety before to part company by the end of the season, after only four months in charge of the team. As a replacement, Catania appointed 37-year-old Vincenzo Montella at his second managerial experience after having served as caretaker at Roma during the final part of the 2010–11 season.

Then came Rolando Maran in the 2012–13 season, who guided Catania to a record-breaking season where they accrued 56 points from 38 Serie A matches. The season also saw Catania take a record number of home wins in one season, its record number of victories overall in a single top flight campaign, as well as its record points total in Serie A for the fifth consecutive season. They also finished ahead of Internazionale at the conclusion of the season and were just five points away from competing in the UEFA Europa League, which would have been an incredible achievement for the side.

Another decline and 2022 bankruptcy 
After being relegated from Serie A after the 2013–14 season, Catania was again relegated to the Lega Pro and deducted nine points, after, during the 2014–15 season, head coach and owner Antonio Pulvirenti admitted to fixing five matches.

The club announced that Sport Investment Group Italia S.p.A. (S.I.G.I.) acquired 95.4% of the club's assets on Friday, 24 July 2020. On 16 January 2021, a preliminary purchase agreement was signed, with which a group of investors represented by the American lawyer Joe Tacopina undertook to purchase all shares from SIGI. The takeover however never materialized, and on 22 December 2021 the club was declared insolvent and entered administration. Following three auctions and a takeover offer by entrepreneur Benedetto Mancini which did not meet requirements, the club's provisional exercise by the Tribunal of Catania was effectively ended on 9 April 2022, thus paving the way to the club's immediate exclusion from the 2021–22 Serie C season. Soon after, the Italian Football Federation formalised the club's exclusion from the Italian professional ranks with immediate effect, and released all of the club's players and non-playing staff.

2022 refoundation
In June 2022, Australian development industry entrepreneur Ross Pelligra, whose mother was born in Catania, was assigned by the City of Catania the right to register a new club in the Italian Serie D, in compliance with Article 52 of N.O.I.F. regulation. He promised to invest ingent economical resources with the main goal to bring back Catania in Serie A, also showing interest in acquiring the Torre Del Grifo training center, built during the Pulvirenti era and considered one of the best in Italy.

The new club, named Catania Società Sportiva Dilettantistica, with Ross Pelligra as president and Vincenzo Grella as vice-president, was subsequently admitted to the 2022–23 Serie D.

Players

Current squad

Presidential history
Catania have had several presidents over the course of their history, some of which have been the owners of the club, others have been honorary presidents, here is a list of them from 1946 onwards.

Managerial history 

Catania have had many managers and trainers throughout the history of a club, in some seasons more than one manager was in charge. Here is a chronological list of them from 1946 onwards.
{|
|width="10"| 
|valign="top"|

|width="30"| 
|valign="top"|

|}

Stadium information

Name: Stadio Angelo Massimino
Location: Catania
Capacity: 23,420
Inauguration: 27 November 1937
Pitch Size: 110 x 70 metres

Catania first made their debut at the Stadio Angelo Massimino, then called the Stadio Cibali, in 1937. The stadium was renamed in honour of former president Angelo Massimino in 2002; he had been president of the club from 1969 until his death in 1996.

It has been proposed that the club would move to a 33,765 seater stadium named Stadio Dèi Palici, which is to be located in the southern outskirts of the city of Catania in an industrial zone called Pantano d'Arci.

Sports center

Catania carries out its training sessions at the Torre del Grifo Village sports center, considered among the best in Europe, inaugurated on May 18, 2011, and located in the adjacent municipality of Mascalucia. Owned by the Etna club, the center covers an area of 150,000 m2 and has four regulation soccer fields, two with natural grass and two with synthetic grass, two swimming pools, four gyms, a hotel with 150 beds, local restaurant and canteen. Furthermore, the structure is equipped with a series of futuristic services, among which a multipurpose center open to the public, a hotel and accommodation for the youth sector and a rehabilitation center equipped with state-of-the-art facilities stand out. The center also includes an 8-a-side football field and two 7-a-side football fields. In addition, Torre del Grifo also houses the headquarters of Calcio Catania.

Honours

important placings

Divisional movements

Club records
Highest League Position: 8th, in the 1960–61 1964–65 and 2012–13 seasons.
Most League Appearances: 281, Damiano Morra between 1975 and 1984.
Most League Goals: 47, Guido Klein and Adelmo Prenna.
Most Serie A Appearances: 150, Giuseppe Vavassori between 1961 and 1966.
Most Serie A Points: 56 points in the 2012–13 season

Supporters 
Catania is one of the two most supported teams in Sicily, together with harsh rivals Palermo, with whom they compete in the Derby di Sicilia.

References

External links
Catania's official website

 
Football clubs in Italy
Football clubs in Sicily
Association football clubs established in 1946
Serie D clubs
Eccellenza
1946 establishments in Italy
Phoenix clubs (association football)